Curtis Brown (July 15, 1923 – December 3, 1999) was an American baseball first baseman in the Negro leagues. He played with the New York Black Yankees in 1947.

References

External links
 and Seamheads

New York Black Yankees players
1923 births
1999 deaths
Baseball players from Florida
Baseball first basemen
20th-century African-American sportspeople